Burgas Airport  is an international airport in southeast Bulgaria and the second largest in the country. The airport principally serves Burgas and other seaside resorts of Bulgarian south coast which attract many tourists during the summer leisure season. In 2018 it handled 3,277,229 passengers, a 9.9% increase compared to 2017.

History

Early years
On 27 June 1937, the French company CIDNA (now part of Air France), chose the area of Burgas Airport to build a radio station and signed a contract with the Bulgarian government for its use. The contract expressly stated that the staff of Burgas Airport would be Bulgarian. 

On 29 June 1947, Balkan Bulgarian Airlines began domestic flights between Burgas, Plovdiv and Sofia, using Junkers Ju 52/3m aircraft. In the 1950s and 1960s, the airport was expanded and modernized by building a concrete runway. In 1970, the airport became an international airport serving 45 destinations.

Development since the 2000s
Burgas airport has been subject to heavy traffic following the growing tourism industry in Bulgaria and was in need of major investments to expand and handle projected passenger traffic. In June 2006, the Bulgarian Government awarded Fraport AG Frankfurt Airport Services Worldwide a 35-year-long concession on both Varna and Burgas airports in return for investments exceeding €500 million.

Fraport entered into partnership with Varna-based company BM Star. The concessionaire has vowed to inject 403 million Euro in the two airports during the lifespan of the arrangement. Fraport will pay 60% of an investment of EUR 403 million over the 35-year concession. The investments will be made in new terminal facilities, vehicles and equipment and expanding apron areas at the airports over the life of the concession.

Facilities

Terminals
In December 2011 construction work began on the new Terminal 2. The new terminal building was designed so that it can be easily upgraded to further increase capacity, if necessary. Construction of the new terminal was completed in 2013, and has been operational since December 2013.

Terminal 2 replaced the older Terminal 1, which was built in the 1950s and expanded in the early 1990s, and now handles all of the airport's passenger traffic. The terminal is equipped with 31 check-in counters, three boarding-card checkpoints, nine security lanes and eight departure gates. There is also a  outdoor courtyard.

Runway
At , Burgas Airport has the fourth longest runway in the Balkans, after Athens Airport, Sofia Airport and Belgrade Airport.

On 31 October 2016, reconstruction and rehabilitation of taxiways began at Burgas airport. The project includes a complete rehabilitation of 3,500 square meters of taxiway "H", complete rehabilitation of taxiway "A", as well as area adjacent to the runway holding point. The control and monitoring system for airfield lighting and approach light equipment will be replaced. The total investment of Fraport Twin Star Airport Management in these projects is over BGN 12 million.

Airlines and destinations
The following airlines operate regular scheduled and charter flights at Burgas Airport:

Statistics

Traffic

Ground transportation

Bus
Line No 15 connects Burgas airport with Burgas South bus station.

Intercity buses from Burgas to Pomorie, Aheloy, Ravda, Nessebar and Sunny beach also stop close to the airport. The stop is located at the roundabout on the main road across from the terminal building.

Taxi
The Taxi Piazza is located in front of the Arrivals Terminal at Burgas Airport. A taxi ride from Burgas Airport to the city takes approximately 15 minutes, depending on the traffic intensity.

Parking
Passengers and guests arriving at Burgas Airport with their personal car can use the commercially available parking lot, located in the immediate vicinity of the main terminal building. The parking lot has 199 car spaces available and is accessible 24 hours a day.

Incidents and accidents
On 18 July 2012, an attack at Burgas Airport occurred. A suicide bomber boarded a bus which was transporting Israeli citizens to the Bulgarian resort of Sunny Beach located in Burgas, the perpetrator detonated the bomb killing six civilians (and one suicide bomber) as well as injuring 32 people. The attack resulted in the closure of Burgas Airport for over 30 hours, resulting in the majority of flights diverting to Varna Airport.

See also
 List of airports in Bulgaria
 List of airlines of Bulgaria
 List of the busiest airports in Europe
 2012 Burgas bus bombing

References

External links
 

Airports in Bulgaria
Airport
Airport